The Rooster Crows: A Book of American Rhymes and Jingles, written and illustrated by Maud and Miska Petersham, is a 1945 picture book published by Simon & Schuster. The Rooster Crows was a Caldecott Medal winner for illustration in 1946. This book is a collection of traditional American nursery rhymes, finger games, skipping rhymes, jingles, and counting-out rhymes. They come from collections all over America.

Description
The book is 64 pages, with rhymes and jingles as well illustrations on each page. The illustrations in the book are done in pencil with color. The colors in the book stay within grey, white, green, orange, and red.

Plot summary
“Little Miss Muffet” and “Star Light, Star Bright,” come back to the memory as easily as “Roses are red, Violets are blue.” There are finger games that give illustrations of how to play as one goes: 
These are mothers knives and forks
And this is mother's table.
This is mother's looking glass
And this is baby cradle.
the rhyme has illustration so the reader can understand to put your hand together like a knife, and end with a cradle which helps kids and makes the book even more interesting. The setting and clothing are very different from our time today(2014) which may seem like the book is old fashioned, but it has much to show in the enjoyable pictures. Little details such as the children wearing overalls, children wearing bonnets, and just the overall color structure highlights the time frame of these rhymes. The illustrations are done in pencil and they have so much detail. The children's faces in the illustration show much feelings and expression.

Critical reception
A 1967 review in The Horn Book Magazine states the Petershams have made delightful pictures, in soft harmonious colors, with plenty of humor for these and many other rhymes that American children chant freely. According to Jill May Petershams writing is simple and smooth; it is not descriptive and is not detailed in plot. The themes reflect Petersham's optimism; the plots contain an exciting drama and are resolved through positive actions. Stated by Pilgrim J. the P.s wrote patriotic books known collectively as This Is America series. An American ABC (1941) and The Rooster Crows: A Book of American Rhymes and Jingles (1945) were included in this series.

References

1945 children's books
1945 poetry books
American picture books
American poetry collections
Caldecott Medal–winning works
Children's poetry books